Maheri is a surname. Notable people with the surname include:

Dodo Maheri, Pakistani politician
Javad Maheri (born 1983), Iranian footballer